Nudiviruses are a family of animal viruses that constitute the family Nudiviridae. Insects and marine crustaceans serve as natural hosts. There are 11 species in this family, assigned to 4 genera. Diseases associated with this family include: death in larvae, chronic disease in adults.

Structure and life cycle

Nudiviruses are characterized by rod-shaped and enveloped nucleocapsids and they replicate in the nucleus of infected host cells. In some parasitoid wasp species, a nudivirus genome, in proviral form, is integrated into the wasp genome and produces virus like particles called polydnaviruses that are injected into lepidopteran larvae and are thought to facilitate parasitization of the larvae. Nudiviruses infect only insects and marine crustaceans.

Transmission of nudiviruses occurs generally by feeding or mating. Infections can be lethal for the larvae and can possibly reduce the fitness of the host by reducing offspring production and survival among adults.

Taxonomy
The family Nudiviridae contains the following genera:

Alphanudivirus
Betanudivirus
Deltanudivirus
Gammanudivirus

Phylogeny
Gene content comparison and phylogenetic analyses show that nudiviruses share 20 core genes with baculoviruses and form a monophyletic sister group with them. Fossil calibration estimate this association arose 100 million years ago(Mya), while the last common ancestor of BVs, nudiviruses, and baculoviruses existed approximately 312 Mya. Baculoviruses and nudiviruses differ in gene content, genome organization, cytopathology, infection of adults and most likely in host range. The 20 core genes common in both baculoviruses and nudiviruses are involved in RNA transcription, DNA replication, virion structural components and many other functions. Gene content and sequence similarity suggest that the nudiviruses GbNV, HzNV-1, and OrNV form a monophyletic group of nonoccluded double-stranded DNA viruses, which separated from the baculovirus lineage before this radiated into dipteran-, hymenopteran-, and lepidopteran-specific clades of occluded nucleopolyhedroviruses and granuloviruses.

Host-virus relations
Drosophila innubila nudivirus – Drosophila innubila (Diptera)
Gryllus bimaculatus nudivirus – black cricket (Teleogryllus commodus)
Helicoverpa zea nudivirus 1 – cotton bollworm
Helicoverpa zea nudivirus 2 – cotton bollworm
Homarus gammarus nudivirus - European lobster (Homarus gammarus)
Oryctes rhinoceros nudivirus – rhinoceros beetle Oryctes rhinoceros
Penaeus monodon nudivirus – black tiger shrimp
Dikerogammarus haemobaphes nudivirus – an amphipod crustacean (Dikerogammarus haemobaphes)

Defense mechanisms
In many organisms, apoptosis can be regarded as an early defense mechanism against viral infection. Some viral genes allow the cell to survive for longer while producing more virions; Heliothis zea Nudivirus 1 (HzNV-1 or Hz-1 virus), a nudivirus with a broad host range, has been shown to block an induced-apoptosis gene (hhi1). A functional anti-apoptosis gene, (Hz-iap2), has been found to suppress the hhi1 gene which can cause the cell to die. A second inhibitor gene (Ac-iap2) to the hhi1 gene has been also discovered, but its function is still uncertain.

Nudivirus encoded microRNAs
Micro RNAs (miRNAs) are small non-coding RNA molecules that play important roles in the regulation of genes in eukaryotic organisms. Virus encoded miRNAs are commonly reported in DNA viruses and several nudiviruses have been reported to encode miRNAs. The first reported nudivirus encoded miRNA was from Heliothis zea nudivirus-1 which was shown to regulate virus latency. Two other viruses Drosophila innubila nudivirus and Oryctes rhinoceros nudivirus have also been reported to encode miRNA molecules from transcriptomic studies, however the role of these miRNAs and their role in virus-host interactions is yet to be experimentally determined.

History
In 2007, the genus Nudivirus was proposed to include viruses similar to the Oryctes rhinoceros virus. Nudiviruses were classified as the family Nudiviridae in 2013.

Etymology
The word "nudivirus" comes from the Latin nudus, which means naked and virus, poison. Naked refers to the fact that most do not have the dense protein bodies which surround baculoviruses. However occluded nudiviruses, with such protein bodies, such as those of Tipula oleracea and Penaeus monodon have been characterized.

References

Nudiviridae
Virus families